The cave-dwelling frog (Ranoidea cavernicola) is a species of frog in the subfamily Pelodryadinae. It is endemic to Australia where its natural habitats are subtropical or tropical dry shrubland, subtropical or tropical dry lowland grassland, rivers, rocky areas, inland karsts, and caves.

References
 
 Biswas Jayant 2014 Occurrence and Distribution of Cave Dwelling Frogs of Peninsular India).

Ranoidea (genus)
Amphibians of Western Australia
Cave amphibians
Amphibians described in 1979
Taxonomy articles created by Polbot
Frogs of Australia
Taxobox binomials not recognized by IUCN